The 1996 Vuelta a Murcia was the 12th edition of the Vuelta a Murcia cycle race and was held on 6 March to 10 March 1996. The race started and finished in Murcia. The race was won by Melcior Mauri.

General classification

References

1996
1996 in road cycling
1996 in Spanish sport